Víctor Camarasa Ferrando (born 28 May 1994) is a Spanish professional footballer who plays as a central midfielder for Real Oviedo.

Club career

Levante
Born in Meliana, Valencian Community, Camarasa joined local Valencia CF's youth academy in 2001, aged seven. Ten years later he was released, and eventually finished his development with neighbouring Levante UD, making his senior debut with the reserves in the 2012–13 season, in the Segunda División B.

On 7 December 2013, Camarasa played his first competitive game with the main squad, starting in a 1–0 away loss against Recreativo de Huelva in the round of 32 of the Copa del Rey. He signed a new six-year deal with the club two days later, and scored his first goal on the 17th to help to turn the Cup deficit in his team's favour by closing the 4–0 home win.

Camarasa made his La Liga debut on 4 January 2014, coming on as a substitute for Simão Mate in a 2–0 defeat at Valencia CF. He was promoted to the first team in July, and was made a starter by new manager José Luis Mendilibar.

On 4 October 2014, Camarasa scored his first goal in the top flight, netting his side's second in a 3–3 draw at SD Eibar. On 11 August 2016, after suffering relegation, he was loaned to Deportivo Alavés also of the top tier, for one year.

Betis
On 29 June 2017, Camarasa signed a five-year contract with Real Betis in the same league. He scored his first competitive goal for them on 18 December, helping close a 2–0 away victory over Málaga CF.

On 9 August 2018, Camarasa joined Cardiff City on loan for the upcoming campaign. He made his Premier League debut nine days later, playing 76 minutes in a 0–0 home draw against Newcastle United. His first goal came on 2 September, but in a 3–2 loss to Arsenal also at the Cardiff City Stadium.

In August 2019, Camarasa signed with Crystal Palace on loan until the following 30 June, with an option to make the move permanent afterwards. He made his debut on 27 August in a 0–0 home draw against Colchester United in the second round in the EFL Cup, with the tie being lost after a penalty shoot-out.

Camarasa returned to both Alavés and the Spanish top division on 13 January 2020, agreeing to a six-month loan deal. He missed the entire 2020–21 due to an anterior cruciate ligament injury.

On 31 January 2023, Camarasa left the Estadio Benito Villamarín.

Oviedo
On 1 February 2023, Segunda División club Real Oviedo announced an agreement in principle with Camarasa for him to join until the end of the season.

International career
Camarasa won the first of his four caps for Spain at under-21 level on 12 November 2014, playing 25 minutes in a 4–1 friendly home loss to Belgium.

Career statistics

References

External links

1994 births
Living people
People from Horta Nord
Sportspeople from the Province of Valencia
Spanish footballers
Footballers from the Valencian Community
Association football midfielders
La Liga players
Segunda División B players
Atlético Levante UD players
Levante UD footballers
Deportivo Alavés players
Real Betis players
Real Oviedo players
Premier League players
Cardiff City F.C. players
Crystal Palace F.C. players
Spain under-21 international footballers
Spanish expatriate footballers
Expatriate footballers in Wales
Expatriate footballers in England
Spanish expatriate sportspeople in Wales
Spanish expatriate sportspeople in England